Shaikh Shamim Ahmed (20 March 1938 – 22 September 2019) was an Indian politician and social worker. In 1980, he was elected as an MLA from the Mumbai Chinchpokli Constituency as an Indian National Congress candidate.

Early life
Shaikh Shamim Ahmed, the son of Shaikh Azizur Rahman, was born into a family of landlords in the small town of Sudanipur (Shudnipur), in Azamgarh district, Uttar Pradesh.

Career

In 1980, Ahmed was elected as an MLA from the Chinchpokli Constituency as an Indian National Congress candidate. He was a Member of the Maharashtra Legislative Assembly from 1980 to 1985.

Political and social activities 
In 1977 at the call of "Jail bharo andolan" (fill up the jails) in support of Indira Gandhi, (former Prime Minister of India) Ahmed took the initiative and courted arrest with 96 supporters at Azamgarh, Uttar Pradesh. He was sentenced to three days imprisonment and sent to Varanasi Central jail.
He contested general elections for the Assembly in 1978 as a Congress (I) candidate.

Elections contested
(1) 5th Lok Sabha Elections Feb-1971 (as Independent candidate) from 5 Bombay Central South, constituency.
(2) Maharashtra Vidhan Sabha Elections 1978, as Congress (I) Candidate, from Chinchpokli, Mumbai, constituency
(3) Maharashtra Vidhan Sabha Elections 1980, as Indian National Congress, Candidate, from Chinchpokli, Mumbai, constituency.

Positions held
1) 1978–1980 – General Secretary, B.R.C.C. (I) Minority Cell.
2) 1978–1990 – Vice President Bombay Central South District Congress Committee.
3) Special Executive Magistrate (1988–1990)
4) Special Executive Officer  (2004–2008)

Maharashtra Assembly Results 1980 
Constituency : 25 . Chinchpokli

 Elector : 115834 Voters : 34346 Poll percentage : 29.65% Valid votes: 33899

References 

 Maharshtra Assembly Elections Result - 1980
GENERAL ELECTIONS - INDIA, 1971
Maharshtra Assembly Elections Result - 1978

1938 births
2019 deaths
Indian National Congress politicians from Maharashtra
Politicians from Azamgarh district
Maharashtra MLAs 1980–1985
20th-century Indian Muslims